Jackson Township is one of twelve townships in Bartholomew County, Indiana, United States. As of the 2010 census, its population was 949 and it contained 463 housing units.

Geography

Unincorporated towns
 Mount Healthy
 Waymansville
(This list is based on USGS data and may include former settlements.)

Adjacent townships
 Ohio Township (north)
 Wayne Township (east)
 Hamilton Township, Jackson County (south)
 Pershing Township, Jackson County (southwest)
 Van Buren Township, Brown County (west)

Major highways
  Indiana State Road 58

Lakes
 Lutheran Lake

School districts
 Bartholomew County School Corporation

Political districts
 Indiana's 9th congressional district
 State House District 65
 State Senate District 41

References
 United States Census Bureau 2007 TIGER/Line Shapefiles
 United States Board on Geographic Names (GNIS)
 United States National Atlas

External links

 Indiana Township Association
 United Township Association of Indiana

Townships in Bartholomew County, Indiana
Townships in Indiana